Rongguang Bridge is a historic stone arch bridge over the Eastern Zhejiang Canal in Keqiao District, Shaoxing, Zhejiang, China.

History
The present bridge was completed in the Chenghua period (1465–1487) of the Ming dynasty (1368–1644). Its name comes from a nearby Buddhist temple named "Rongguang Temple". In March 2013, it was listed among the seventh batch of "Major National Historical and Cultural Sites in Zhejiang" as a part of Historic Bridges in Shaoxing by the State Council of China.

Architecture

References

Bridges in Zhejiang
Arch bridges in China
Ming dynasty architecture
Bridges completed in the 15th century
Buildings and structures completed in the 15th century